"Soco" is a song by Nigerian recording artist Starboy (better known as Wizkid), released in February 2018. The song was produced by Nigerian record producer Northboi and features Nigerian artists Terri, Spotless and Ceeza Milli. It was certified Gold by Music Canada in 2020. It's Official Music Video has been viewed over 100 Million times on YouTube.

Awards and nominations 
"Soco" won Song of the Year and was nominated for Best Pop Single at the 2018 African Musik Magazine Awards (AFRIMMA). It won Best Collaboration of the Year at the 2018 Soundcity MVP Awards Festival.

Charts

Certifications

References

Nigerian songs
2018 songs
2018 singles